The Bannatyne Club, named in honour of George Bannatyne and his famous anthology of Scots literature the Bannatyne Manuscript, was a text publication society founded by Sir Walter Scott to print rare works of Scottish interest, whether in history, poetry, or general literature. The club was established in 1823 and printed 116 volumes before being dissolved in 1861.

Membership 
Membership in the Bannatyne Club was much more diverse than that found in more elite clubs such as the Roxburghe Club, including members from the publishing and printing trades in addition to lawyers. While the club was still elite, contributions by amateurs was considered valuable. This made the Bannaytne club a transitional organization between the elitism of previous clubs and the open policy of its successors. Like many Gentlemen's club's of the 18th and 19th centuries, the Bannatyne Club allowed members engage in homosocial relations and escape from constrictions associated with class, gender, and race. For its members, the club served to emphasize Scotland's distinct identity by publishing literary and historical texts. Between 1823 and 1827, membership expanded rapidly, increasing from thirty-one to one hundred members. Members were required to contribute five guineas each year as a membership fee.

Members

Founder members of February 7, 1823
 Sir Walter Scott
 Thomas Thomson
 Thomas Kinnear
 David Laing
 William Adam of Blair Adam
 Sir William Arbuthnot, 1st Baronet
 James Ballantyne
 William Bannatyne, Lord Bannatyne
 Robert Bell
 John Clerk, Lord Eldin
 Henry Cockburn, Lord Cockburn
 Archibald Constable
 David Constable
 Robert Dundas of Arniston
 Robert Graham of Balgowan
 Henry Jardine of Harwood
 Rev. John Lee 
 James Maidment
 Gilbert Laing Meason
 John Murray, Lord Murray
 Robert Pitcairn
 Sir Samuel Shepherd 
 James Skene of Rubislaw
 George Smythe
 Patrick Fraser Tytler (1823)

Further Members admitted November 25, 1823

 Gilbert Elliot-Murray-Kynynmound, 2nd Earl of Minto
 George Chalmers
 William Blair of Avonton
 James T. Gibson Craig
 Andrew Skene
 Thomas Maitland, Lord Dundrennan

Later members

 George Hamilton-Gordon, 4th Earl of Aberdeen (1827)
 Alexander Hamilton, 10th Duke of Hamilton (1828)
 Earl of Ashburnham
 John Russell, 6th Duke of Bedford
 Henry Vassall-Fox, 3rd Baron Holland
 Cosmo Innes
 Robert Pitcairn

February 1859
 The Earl of Aberdeen 
 William Patrick Adam, Esq 
 The Earl of Ashburnham 
 Lord Belhaven and Hamilton 
 William Blair 
 Beriah Botfield, Esq., MP 
 Marquess of Breadalban 
 Sir Thomas MakDougall Brisbane 
 George Brodie, Esq 
 Charles Dashwood Bruce, Esq 
 Duke of Buccleuch and Queensberry 
 Dean Richard Butler 
 Sir Hugh Hume Campbell 
 James Campbell, Esq 
 Thomas Carnegy, Esq 
 Earl of Cawdor  
 Patrick Chalmers, Esq 
 Right Hon. Sir George Clerk 
 David Constable, Esq 
 Thomas Constable, Esq 
 Andrew Coventry, Esq  
 David Cowan, Esq 
 James T. Gibson Craig, Esq (Treasurer) 
 Sir William Gibson Craig 
 Marquess of Dalhousie 
 George Home Drummond, Esq 
 Henry Drummond, Esq, MP 
 Right Hon. Sir David Dundas 
 George Dundas, Esq.  
 William Pitt Dundas, Esq 
 Earl of Ellesmere 
 Joseph Walter King Eyton, Esq 
 Lieut.-Col. Robert Ferguson, MP 
 Count Mercer De Flahault 
 Earl of Gosford 
 William Gott, Esq 
 Robert Graham, Esq 
 Earl of Haddington 
 Duke of Hamilton and Brandon 
 Sir Thomas Buchan Hepburn 
 James Maitland Hog, Esq 
 Right Hon. John Hope, Lord Justice-Clerk 
 Cosmo Innes, Esq 
 Daved Iriving, LL.D 
 Hon. James Ivory, Lord Ivory 
 David Laing, Esq (Secretary) 
 John Bailey Langhorne, Esq 
 The Earl of Lauderdale 
 Very Rev. Principal John Lee, DD 
 Lord Lindsay 
 James Loch, Esq 
 The Marquess of Lothian 
 Lord Lovat 
 James MacKenzie, Esq 
 John Whiteford MacKenzie, Esq 
 Keith Stewart MacKenzie, Esq 
 William Forbes MacKenzie, Esq 
 James Maidment, Esq 
 Sir William Maxwell, Bart 
 The Hon. William Leslie Melville 
 The Earl of Minto 
 James Moncreiff, Esq., MP 
 The Earl of Morton 
 James Patrick Muirhead, Esq 
 Hon. Sir John A. Murray, Lord Murray 
 Robert Nasmyth, Esq 
 Hon. Charles Neaves 
 Lord Neaves 
 The Earl of Northesk 
 Lord Panmure 
 Alexander Pringle, Esq 
 John Richardson, Esq 
 Duke of Roxburghe 
 Reverend Hew Scott 
 James R. Hope Scott, Esq 
 Earl of Selkirk 
 James Young Simpson, MD 
 Alexander Sinclair, Esq 
 James Skene, Esq 
 William Smythe, Esq 
 John Spottiswoode, Esq 
 Edward Stanley, Esq 
 Reverend William Stevenson, DD 
 Hon. Charles Francis Stuart 
 Duke of Sutherland 
 Archibald Campbell Swinton, Esq 
 Alexander Thomson, Esq 
 Sir Walter Calverley Trevelyan 
 William B. D. D. Turnbull, Esq. 
 Adam Urquart, Esq 
 Alexander Maconochie Welwood, Esq.

Publications
Full texts of the complete Bannatyne Club publications are available online through the National Library of Scotland.
 Memoirs touching the Revolution in Scotland, originally published 1714, Colin Lindsay, 3rd Earl of Balcarres (1841)
 The Bannatyne Miscellany; Containing Original Papers and Tracts Chiefly Relating to the History and Literature of Scotland [Published in Edinburgh] (1827)
 Melville of Halhill, Sir James, Memoirs of His Own Life, ed. T. Thomson (1827)
 Laing, D. ed., Original Letters relating to the Ecclesiastical Affairs of Scotland, 2 vols (Published in Edinburgh, 1851)
 Siege of the Castle of Edinburgh MDCLXXXIX, presented to the Bannatyne Club by Robert Bell (1828)
 The Æneid of Virgil Translated into Scottish Verse by Gavin Douglas, Bishop of Dunkeld, 2 vols. (1839)

References

Further reading 
The Bannatyne Club- Lists of members and the rules with a catalogue of the books. Edinburgh 1867.
Bannatyne Club Publications - National Library of Scotland

1861 disestablishments in Scotland
Scottish literature
19th century in Scotland
Cultural history of Scotland
Historiography of Scotland
Text publication societies
Heritage organisations in Scotland
1823 establishments in Scotland